Yeh Chang-ting (born 5 December 1967) is a professional golfer from Taiwan.

Yeh has played on the Japan Golf Tour for most of his career, where he has one victory in 1997. His first full season on Tour was in 1995. His lone victory came at the 1997  Nikkei Cup Torakichi Nakamura Memorial.

Yeh has also been a member of the Asian Tour in 1996 and 2004 to 2007. He has two wins on the Asian Tour.

Professional wins (7)

Japan Golf Tour wins (1)

Japan Golf Tour playoff record (1–0)

Asian Tour wins (2)

Other wins (4)
1993 Philippine Open, Republic of China Sun Feng Open, Republic of China Lion Cup
1999 Mercuries Taiwan Masters

Team appearances
Amateur
Eisenhower Trophy (representing Taiwan): 1992

Professional
Dunhill Cup (representing Taiwan): 1994

External links

Taiwanese male golfers
Asian Tour golfers
Japan Golf Tour golfers
1967 births
Living people